The Mayo Clinic is a nonprofit American academic medical center focused on integrated health care, education, and research. It employs over 4,500 physicians and scientists, along with another 58,400 administrative and allied health staff, across three major campuses: Rochester, Minnesota; Jacksonville, Florida; and Phoenix/Scottsdale, Arizona. The practice specializes in treating difficult cases through tertiary care and destination medicine. It is home to the top-15 ranked Mayo Clinic Alix School of Medicine in addition to many of the highest regarded residency education programs in the United States. It spends over $660 million a year on research and has more than 3,000 full-time research personnel.

William Worrall Mayo settled his family in Rochester in 1864 and opened a sole proprietorship medical practice that evolved under his sons, Will and Charlie Mayo, along with practice partners Stinchfield, Graham, Plummer, Millet, Judd, and Balfour, into Mayo Clinic. Today, in addition to the hospital at Rochester, Mayo Clinic has major campuses in Arizona and Florida. Most recently, in 2020, the Mayo Clinic bought a facility in central London, UK. The Mayo Clinic Health System also operates affiliated facilities throughout Minnesota, Wisconsin, and Iowa.

Mayo Clinic has ranked number one in the United States for seven consecutive years in U.S. News & World Report Best Hospitals Honor Roll, maintaining a position at or near the top for more than 35 years. It has been on the list of "100 Best Companies to Work For" published by Fortune magazine for fourteen consecutive years, and has continued to achieve this ranking through 2017. Drawing in patients from around the globe, Mayo Clinic performs near the highest number of transplants in the country, including both solid organ and hematologic transplantation.

Corporate affairs 
Mayo Clinic is a nonprofit hospital system with campuses in Rochester, Minnesota; Scottsdale and Phoenix, Arizona; and Jacksonville, Florida. Mayo Clinic employs 63,000 people, including more than 4,500 physicians and scientists and 58,400 administrative and allied health staff, as of 2018. Of those, approximately 34,000 are based in Rochester. In addition, Mayo Clinic partially owns and operates the Mayo Clinic Health System, which consists of more than 70 hospitals and clinics across Minnesota, Iowa, and Wisconsin. Mayo Clinic also operates the Mayo Clinic College of Medicine and Science, a nonprofit college dedicated to training medical and allied health professionals at Mayo Hospitals in Minnesota, Arizona, and Florida.

The clinic created an independent business subsidiary in London in partnership with Oxford University Clinic, a collaboration between the University of Oxford and Oxford University Hospitals NHS Foundation Trust to operate a clinic starting in 2019.  The clinic, in the Harley Street Medical Area, will focus on preventative healthcare, with magnetic resonance imaging and CT scan technology and open in the summer of 2019.

Mayo Clinic is led by president and CEO Gianrico Farrugia, M.D. John H. Noseworthy, M.D. retired as president and CEO in December 2018; his predecessor, Denis A. Cortese, M.D. retired in November 2009. Samuel A. DiPiazza, Jr., retired CEO of PricewaterhouseCoopers, is chairman of Mayo Clinic's governing board of trustees.

Core operations

Clinical practice 
In 2018, more than 1.2 million different patients from all 50 states and 138 countries were seen at Mayo Clinic facilities. Mayo Clinic offers highly specialized medical care, and a large portion of the patient population are referrals from smaller clinics and hospitals across the upper Midwest and the United States. Mayo Clinic physicians are paid a fixed salary, which is not linked to patient volume (relative value units) or income from fee-for-service payments. This practice is thought to decrease the monetary motivation to see patients in excessive numbers and increase the incentive to spend more time with individuals.

Research 
Mayo Clinic researchers contribute to the understanding of disease processes, best clinical practices, and translation of findings from the laboratory to the clinical practice. As of 2018, research personnel included 254 full-time scientific faculty, 766 physicians actively involved in research, and 4,027 full-time research personnel. In 2018, there were 3,067 new human research studies approved by the institutional review board and 12,760 ongoing human research studies. These research initiatives led to 9,275 research publications and review articles in peer-reviewed journals. In recent years, 100% of Mayo Clinic's internal medicine residents across the three campuses have published research during their tenure.

Education 

The Mayo Clinic College of Medicine and Science (MCCMS), established in 1915, offers educational programs embedded in Mayo Clinic's clinical practice and biomedical research activities. MCCMS consists of five accredited schools, including the M.D. degree-granting Mayo Clinic Alix School of Medicine as well as the master's and Ph.D. degree-granting Mayo Clinic Graduate School of Biomedical Sciences. The Mayo Clinic School of Health Sciences offers training for about 60 health sciences career fields. The Mayo Clinic School of Graduate Medical Education runs over 300 residences and fellowships in all medical and surgical specialties. The Mayo Clinic School of Continuous Professional Development delivers continuing education courses aimed at practicing medical professionals.

History

Early years 
Mayo Clinic originated with the medical practice of William Worrall Mayo, M.D., (1819–1911). Born near Manchester, England, he was mentored by the eminent British scientist John Dalton and immigrated to the United States in 1846. He worked his way west, earning two medical degrees at a time when formal education for physicians was limited. Mayo settled in Indiana, and he married Louise Abigail Wright in 1851. They moved to Minnesota Territory in 1854, seeking a more healthful climate. The family relocated within Minnesota several times until Mayo's appointment as an examining surgeon for the Union Army military draft board during the American Civil War brought them to Rochester. On January 27, 1864,  Mayo advertised in the Rochester City Post the opening of a private medical practice "over the Union Drug Store on Third Street" with "all calls answered by day or night".

Both of W. W. Mayo's sons, William James Mayo (1861–1939) and Charles Horace Mayo (1865–1939), who became known as Dr. Will and Dr. Charlie, grew up in Rochester and attended medical school. William graduated in 1883 and joined his father's practice, with Charles joining in 1888.
On August 21, 1883, a tornado struck Rochester, causing at least 37 deaths and over 200 injuries. One-third of the town was destroyed, but the Mayo family escaped serious harm. Relief efforts began immediately in a variety of makeshift facilities. Mayo was placed in charge of organizing medical care for the wounded survivors. Needing nurses, he reached out to Mother Alfred Moes, the founder of the Sisters of Saint Francis of Rochester, Minnesota (a teaching order).

After the crisis subsided, Mother Alfred approached W. W. Mayo with a proposal: The Sisters of St. Francis would raise the funds to build a hospital in Rochester if he and his sons would provide the medical and surgical care. The agreement was made over a handshake. On September 30, 1889, Saint Marys Hospital was opened by the Sisters with the three Mayo physicians on staff.

Group practice 
The growing specialization of medicine and the expanding use of railroads, automobiles, and mass communications provided context for what Mayo Clinic calls its most significant and enduring contribution to the medical field: the content of integrated multispecialty practice.

Starting in the 1890s, the Mayo brothers welcomed other physicians to join them. W. W. Mayo's solo practice had evolved into a family practice with his sons' participation and now became a group practice with colleagues whose professional skills and ethos of teamwork complemented those of the Mayo brothers. Mayo Clinic's first partners were physicians  Augustus W. Stinchfield, Christopher Graham, Melvin C. Millet, Henry Plummer, E. Star Judd, and Donald Balfour.

Preeminent among the early physicians who joined the practice was Henry Plummer, M.D. A specialist in thyroid disease, he made milestone contributions to the treatment of goiter. In terms of organizational development, he collaborated with the Mayo brothers in coordinating the introduction of specialties that expanded the scope of the Mayo practice beyond its origins in surgery. A polymath whose interests included architecture, engineering, and art, Plummer also created many of the systems and procedures that remain central to Mayo Clinic today, such as the integrated "dossier" medical record. In fact, Dr. Will said that hiring Plummer was the best day's work he ever did.

Growth and national expansion 
By virtue of their surgical skills and efficient management, the Mayo brothers were financially successful and professionally prominent.  They both served as president of the American Medical Association and achieved international recognition as surgeons. In 1919, the brothers and their wives donated the assets of the medical practice including land, buildings, and equipment, as well as the majority of their life savings, to transform the private partnership into a not-for-profit organization dedicated to an integrated mission of patient care, medical education, and medical research.

Following World War II, Mayo Clinic continued to expand in Rochester, Minnesota. The 1980s initiated transformative changes that set the course for the modern Mayo Clinic. An early adopter of the Internet, Mayo Clinic has been recognized for its online communications to patients, members of the public and medical professionals.

In 1986, Mayo Clinic formally united with Saint Marys Hospital and Rochester Methodist Hospital. That same year, Mayo Clinic expanded to Florida partly because of a donation of 400 acres of land in Jacksonville from the Davis family. This was followed by expansion to Scottsdale, Arizona, in 1987; the Phoenix, Arizona, campus opened in 1998. In 1992, Mayo Clinic Health System began as a network of community-based medical services in Minnesota, Iowa, and Wisconsin. In 2011, Mayo Clinic launched the Mayo Clinic Care Network, a collection of facilities with access to Mayo Clinic protocols and experts.

In November 2019, the Mayo Clinic, in a joint partnership with SEHA Abu Dhabi Health Services Co, invested $50 million into a 741-bed hospital in the United Arab Emirates for a 25% stake.

At the beginning of 2020 the Mayo Clinic opened a health clinic in central London, in partnership with Oxford University Clinic. It was officially named Mayo Clinic Healthcare. In July 2020 it was reported that the Mayo Clinic had bought Oxford University Clinic's share of the facility, to become the sole owner and its first overseas clinic operated as a Mayo Clinic entity.

Contributions to medicine and science 
In the early 20th century, Henry Plummer developed Mayo Clinic's multi-specialty group practice model and an integrated medical record system. Plummer's system allowed physicians to better share patient information with one another. Prior to Plummer's system, physicians worked in solo practice and shared patient information when necessary either verbally or by letter. Plummer also helped design and fabricate building systems innovations, such as steam sterilization rooms, metal surgical tools and equipment, pneumatic tube system, and knee operated sinks. In 1905, Mayo Clinic advanced a technique of using frozen tissue during surgery to determine if a patient had cancer while the patient was still in the operating room. Mayo Clinic offered the first graduate medical education program in 1915 and the first nonprofit practice aligned with medical education and research. In the 1920s, Albert Compton Broders of the Mayo Clinic created the first index to grade tumors. Mayo Clinic opened the first hospital-based blood bank in Rochester in 1935. Early in Mayo Clinic's history, the hospital designed the one-legged mobile instrument stand known as the Mayo stand.

In the 1930s, Mayo Clinic associates Walter M. Boothby, Randolph Lovelace, and Arthur H. Bulbulian developed a high-altitude mask for oxygen therapy that became known as the BLB flight mask.

During World War II, the U.S. Army tasked Mayo Clinic with finding a solution for pilots who were dying after suffering blackouts. Mayo Clinic hired a team of physicians to research and define the specific physiologic effects causing blackout and unconsciousness during high G forces. Physiologists Earl H. Wood, Edward Baldes, Charles Code, and Edward H. Lambert developed the G-suit with air bladders that prevented blood from pooling in pilots' legs. The suit was worn by U.S. pilots toward the end of World War II.

Two Mayo Clinic physicians were among three people awarded the Nobel Prize in medicine in 1950 for the discovery of cortisone. Professor Edward C. Kendall, PhD, and Philip S. Hench of Mayo Clinic were jointly awarded the Nobel Prize in medicine alongside Tadeus Reichstein, a Swiss chemist who conducted independent research, for the discovery. They separated and identified compounds from the adrenal cortex that produced cortisone and hydrocortisone. Later in the decade, Mayo Clinic began using and refining the Gibbon heart–lung machine in cardiac surgery. It is now known as the Mayo–Gibbon heart–lung machine.

Mayo Clinic associates Edward Howard Lambert, Lealdes (Lee) McKendree Eaton, and Edward Douglas Rooke were the first physicians to substantially describe the clinic and electrophysiological findings of what is known as Lambert–Eaton myasthenic syndrome in 1956. In 1972, the clustering of LEMS with other autoimmune diseases led to the hypothesis that it was caused by autoimmunity.

In 1969, Mayo Clinic doctors performed the first Food and Drug Administration-approved hip replacement in the United States. In 1973, Mayo Clinic bought the first CT scanner in the U.S.

Mayo Clinic and Roche Molecular Biochemicals developed a rapid DNA test in 2001 to detect anthrax in humans and in the environment.

The Mayo Clinic Center for Innovation, was established in 2008 and has since worked on over 270 projects.

In 2013, Mayo Clinic specialists in regenerative medicine begin the "first-in-human study" whereby patient cells are used to attempt to heal heart damage.

After several years using Apple Inc.'s Macintosh computers and mobile devices for patient care and test results, Mayo partnered with Apple in 2014 to develop the Apple Health and HealthKit apps to serve as a central location for personal health information. Mayo Clinic and Delos Living launched the Well Living Lab in September 2015. This research facility is designed to simulate real-world, non-hospital environments to allow Mayo Clinic researchers to study the interaction between indoor spaces and human health.

Architecture and art collection 
As the practice grew in the 20th century, it required additional space. Saint Marys Hospital underwent frequent expansion. Rochester business leader John Kahler built innovative hotel-hospital facilities that served Mayo Clinic patients. In 1914, Mayo Clinic opened the world's first building expressly designed for multispecialty group practice, known as the 1914 "red brick" building. It facilitated ease of movement for patients and staff among specialty areas, brought research and education functions into proximity with clinical practice, and patient amenities. This approach was replicated and enhanced with the adjoining 1928 Mayo Clinic building, later named for Plummer, its principal designer, which is listed on the National Register of Historic Places. The Plummer Building features bronze entry doors designed by artist Charles Brioschi. Each 16-foot high, 5.25-inch thick door weighs 4,000 pounds and features ornamental panels. The doors are closed to memorialize important historical events and influential people, such as the deaths of the Mayo brothers, the assassination of President John F. Kennedy, and the victims of September 11, 2001 terrorist attacks. The 1914 "red brick" building, a National Historic Landmark, was demolished by Mayo Clinic in the 1980s to make way for the Siebens Building (completed in 1989). Mayo Clinic's campus has undergone expansion over the years.

Other notable Mayo Clinic buildings include the Mayo Building (Rochester, Minnesota) (construction completed in 1955), Guggenheim Building (1974), Gonda Building (2001), Opus Imaging Research Building (2007) and recent addition in 2019 – Discovery Square building.

Mayo Clinic's humanities program was founded on the belief that the arts and healing are linked. Over the decades, Mayo Clinic has established an extensive art collection, including these works on display across all campuses:
"Endangered Species" by Andy Warhol
"John D'Aire" by Auguste Rodin
"Fish" by Alexander Calder
"Man and Freedom" by Ivan Meštrović
"Untitled" by Dale Chihuly 
"Four Houses" by Jennifer Bartlett
"The Archer" by Joan Miró
"My Brother and I" by Tuck Langland
"Constellation Earth" by Paul Granlund

Educational programs 

The first medical educational programs at Mayo Clinic were developed in 1915 with the assistance of the University of Minnesota. Mayo Clinic School of Graduate Medical Education and the Mayo Foundation for Medical Education and Research were established in 1915. MFMER was established as a department of the University of Minnesota with a $1.5 million donation to offer graduate programs at the Mayo Clinic in Rochester. The Mayo Clinic School of Graduate Medical Education is now part of the Mayo Clinic College of Medicine and Science, which is divided into five schools. Those schools include Mayo Clinic Alix School of Medicine, Mayo Clinic School of Health Sciences, Mayo Clinic School of Continuous Professional Development, and Mayo Clinic Graduate School of Biomedical Sciences.

In 2011, the foundation that oversees the Mayo Clinic went before the Supreme Court to argue that medical residents should remain exempt from Social Security deductions. In Mayo Foundation v. United States the court sided with the Social Security Administration and required FICA to be deducted going forward.

Current practice 
Mayo Clinic rules mandate that its CEOs must be physicians and come from within Mayo Clinic. John H. Noseworthy, M.D., served as president and CEO from 2009 to 2019. Under his leadership, Mayo Clinic was reorganized into a single operating company with a unified strategy and business plan, which helped the system expand. This included the launch of the Destination Medical Center, a 20-year economic growth plan in Rochester. During this time, annual revenue reached nearly $12 billion, and Mayo Clinic added 7,200 employees.

In 2018, Mayo Clinic announced that Gianrico Farrugia, M.D., a Mayo Clinic physician for more than 30 years, would replace Noseworthy as CEO. Farrugia had served as CEO of Mayo Clinic in Florida since 2015. The replacement adhered to Mayo Clinic's tradition of leadership changes, where a new president or CEO is named every seven to ten years. By 2018, Mayo Clinic doctors saw approximately 1.3 million patients annually.

Innovation 
Mayo Clinic remains at the forefront of medical innovation leading hundreds of clinical trials and offering groundbreaking therapies, such as CAR-T and proton therapies. They are currently one of the leading research centers for the COVID-19 epidemic and were one of the first institutions offering plasma exchange for this patient population.

Mayo Clinic has adopted more than 15,000 mobile devices from Apple for patient care, including the iPad, iPad Mini, and iPhone. Mayo Clinic then created an app for these devices called Synthesis Mobile, which integrated hundreds of their health systems. For Mayo Clinic Care Network members, more apps were created to help patients see their medical records or ask clinicians for assistance. In 2014, Mayo Clinic was developing an app for Apple's HealthKit to help users maintain healthy lifestyles and warn of certain health signs that need attention.

Mayo Clinic, in collaboration with real estate firm Delos Living, launched the Well Living Lab in September 2015. This research facility is designed to simulate real-world, non-hospital environments to allow Mayo Clinic researchers to study the interaction between indoor spaces and human health.

The Mayo Clinic Center for Innovation, established in 2008, was one of the pioneers of innovation in healthcare. It has since worked on over 270 projects and is often looked to as a role model for using design in healthcare.

In March 2018, Mayo Clinic and Mytonomy, a healthcare education system company, partnered to provide video content for cancer patients. The video content is used to address important questions and answers and designed to aid in the decision-making process between patient and doctor.

In September 2019, Mayo Clinic entered into a strategic partnership with Google for health care innovation and cloud computing, and Google planned to open its facility in Rochester, Minnesota, for Mayo Clinic.

In January 2020, Mayo Clinic and NTT Venture Capital joined a $60 million financing for biomedical software startup nference.

Rankings 
Since 2016 the Mayo Clinic, Rochester, has been ranked as the #1 overall hospital in the United States by U.S. News & World Report. A total of almost 5,000 hospitals were considered and ranked in 16 specialties from cancer and heart disease to respiratory disorders and urology; 153 (just over 3 percent of the total) were ranked in at least one of the 16 specialties. Of the 153 hospitals that are ranked in one or more specialties, 20 qualified for the Honor Roll by earning high scores in at least six specialties. Mayo Clinic, Rochester, was ranked in the top 10 in all but one of 16 specialties, in the top 4 in 13 specialties, and was the #1 ranked hospital in 8 of the 12 data-driven specialties.  This year U.S. News expanded their common procedures and conditions list to 9 individual measures, and Mayo was one of fewer than 70 hospitals to score High Performing in every category.  Additionally, Mayo was the only hospital on the 2016–2017 honor roll to also receive 5 stars from CMS.  Every Mayo Clinic hospital received an "A" safety rating from Leapfrog in its April 2017 report.
In 2021–22, Mayo Clinic, Rochester, was ranked again as the #1 overall hospital in the United States by U.S. News & World Report.

Ranked 1st
 Diabetes and Endocrinology
 Gastroenterology
 Geriatrics
 Gynecology
 Nephrology
 Neurology and Neurosurgery
 Pulmonology
 Urology

Ranked 2nd
 Cardiology and Heart Surgery
 Ear, Nose and Throat
 Orthopedics

Ranked 3rd – 6th
 Cancer (3rd)
 Rheumatology (4th)
 Psychiatry (5th)
 Rehabilitation (6th)

High-Performing

 Ophthalmology

See also 
Mayo Clinic Arizona
Mayo Clinic Hospital (Rochester), Saint Marys Campus, Methodist Campus
Mayo Clinic Florida
Mayo Clinic Health System
Mayo Clinic College of Medicine and Science
Mayo Clinic Cancer Center

References

External links 

 
 Salamensky, Shelley, "Inside the Mayo Clinic". The New York Review of Books, September 26, 2018.
 

Mayo Clinic
Webby Award winners
Hospitals in Minnesota
Hospitals established in 1864
1889 establishments in Minnesota
Organizations established in 1889
Non-profit organizations based in Minnesota
Buildings and structures in Rochester, Minnesota
Medical and health organizations based in Minnesota